Tell Talaah, also known as Sara, is a village near Tell Tamer in western al-Hasakah Governorate, northeastern Syria. Administratively it belongs to the Nahiya Tell Tamer.

The village is inhabited by Assyrians belonging to the Assyrian Church of the East. At the 2004 census, it had a population of 800.

See also

Assyrians in Syria
List of Assyrian settlements
Al-Hasakah offensive (February–March 2015)

References

Populated places in al-Hasakah District
Assyrian communities in Syria
Villages in al-Hasakah Governorate